Walker Anthony Buehler (born July 28, 1994) is an American professional baseball pitcher for the Los Angeles Dodgers of Major League Baseball (MLB). He played college baseball for the Vanderbilt Commodores and was a member of their 2014 College World Series championship team. Buehler was selected by the Dodgers 24th overall in the 2015 MLB draft out of Vanderbilt and made his MLB debut in 2017. He was an All-Star in 2019 and 2021 and helped the Dodgers win the 2020 World Series.

Amateur career
Buehler attended Henry Clay High School in Lexington, Kentucky. He was drafted by the Pittsburgh Pirates in the 14th round of the 2012 Major League Baseball Draft, but did not sign and instead honored his commitment to Vanderbilt University. 

As a freshman in 2013, he made 9 starts and appeared in 16 games. He had a 4–3 record with a 3.14 earned run average (ERA) and 57 strikeouts. As a sophomore, he went 12–2 with 111 strikeouts and a 2.64 ERA and was a member of the 2014 College World Series championship team. On June 16, 2014, Buehler pitched 5.1 innings of no-hit relief, retiring the first nine batters he faced and striking out 7 batters in Vanderbilt's 6–4 win over University of California Irvine. 

After the 2014 season Buehler played for Team USA and the Yarmouth–Dennis Red Sox of the Cape Cod Baseball League (CCBL). He posted a 0.63 earned run average with 24 strikeouts over 28.2 innings pitched for the Red Sox. In the 2014 CCBL playoffs, he did not allow a run in 15.1 innings, won both of his starts, and was a co-winner of MVP honors, leading the Red Sox to the league championship. 

In 2015, as a junior he posted a 2.97 ERA in 78.2 innings for the Commodores while striking out 81 and walking 25. Over the course of his three-year college career, he went 20–7 with a 2.88 ERA in 49 games, striking out 249 against only 83 walks.

Professional career

Minor leagues
Buehler was selected by the Los Angeles Dodgers with the 24th overall selection of the 2015 Major League Baseball draft and signed on July 17, 2015, for a $1.78 million bonus. Soon after his signing, it was revealed that he would require Tommy John surgery and would therefore be sidelined for a year and a half with recovery. He finally made his professional baseball debut on August 23, 2016, for the Arizona League Dodgers, striking out three and retiring all six batters he faced. He was then promoted to the Great Lakes Loons of the Midwest League on August 28. He appeared in two games for the Loons, making one start, and did not allow a run or a hit in the three innings he pitched.

Buehler began the 2017 season with the Rancho Cucamonga Quakes of the California League and allowed only three runs in  innings over five starts before he was promoted to the Double-A Tulsa Drillers of the Texas League on May 2. While with the Drillers, he made 11 starts with a 3.49 ERA and was selected to appear in the mid-season Texas League all-star game. He was promoted to the Triple-A Oklahoma City Dodgers at mid-season where he made three starts before transitioning to the bullpen in preparation for a potential September major league callup. He had a 4.63 ERA in  innings for Oklahoma City.  At the end of the season, he was selected as the Dodgers minor league pitcher of the year.

Los Angeles Dodgers

2017

The Dodgers added Buehler to the major league roster for the first time on September 6, 2017, and he made his major league debut that night with two scoreless innings of relief against the Colorado Rockies. His first MLB strikeout was against Charlie Blackmon of the Rockies. He picked up his first major league win with a scoreless inning of relief against the Philadelphia Phillies on September 21. Overall, Buehler appeared in eight Dodgers games in 2017, allowing eight runs in  innings (7.71 ERA) with 12 strikeouts and eight walks.

2018
Buehler made his first major league start on April 23, 2018, against the Miami Marlins, pitching five scoreless innings. On May 4, against the San Diego Padres, he took a no-hitter through six innings, with eight strikeouts, until being taken out of the game after 93 pitches. Three relief pitchers combined to finish it off as the Dodgers won 4–0, the first combined no-hitter in franchise history. He was placed on the disabled list on June 21 because of a rib injury. He returned to make an appearance out of the bullpen on June 28 but allowed five earned runs in one inning before returning to the disabled list. On July 13, Buehler made his first start in over a month against the Los Angeles Angels, allowing two solo home runs to Kole Calhoun but no other earned runs. He set a new career high in strikeouts with nine on August 22. After three more nine-strikeout starts, he struck out 12 on September 19 against the Colorado Rockies.

On October 1, Buehler started the NL West Tie-Breaker Game against the Colorado Rockies. He picked up the win, giving up only one hit and allowing no runner to advance past second base. He also got his first career MLB run batted in in his 47th plate appearance. In 24 appearances for the Dodgers (23 starts and one relief appearance) in 2018, Buehler was 8–5 with a 2.62 ERA and 151 strikeouts. In the 2018 NLDS against the Atlanta Braves, he started one game and allowed five runs in five innings; in the 2018 NLCS against the Milwaukee Brewers he started two games, allowing five runs in  innings; and he threw seven scoreless innings in game 3 of the 2018 World Series against the Boston Red Sox. Buehler finished third in voting for the National League Rookie of the Year, behind Atlanta Braves outfielder Ronald Acuña Jr. and Washington Nationals outfielder Juan Soto.

2019
On April 11, Buehler hit his first career home run off of Michael Wacha of the St. Louis Cardinals. On June 21, he threw his first complete game against the Colorado Rockies, becoming the first Dodger pitcher with over 15 strikeouts and no walks. He struck out 16 Rockies, giving up three hits on 111 pitches. He was selected to the 2019 MLB All-Star Game, his first all-star appearance, in which he gave up one run in one inning. On August 3, Buehler pitched another complete game, against the San Diego Padres. He struck out 15 Padre hitters and walked none; San Diego's only run was a Manuel Margot solo home run. At the same time he became only the third pitcher in MLB history (after Dwight Gooden and Pedro Martínez) with multiple games with 15 strikeouts and no walks in the same season. 

Buehler finished the 2019 regular season with a record of 14–4, and a 3.26 ERA (9th in the NL) in 30 starts, with two complete games and 215 strikeouts. His .778 win–loss percentage was the best in the league, and he also led the league in complete games with two. He finished ninth in the Cy Young Award voting. Buehler was named the Dodgers' game one starter for the NLDS. He allowed only one hit in six scoreless innings, while striking out eight and walking three to pick up the win. He also started the deciding fifth game of the series, allowing only one run in  innings while striking out seven in a game the Dodgers eventually lost in extra innings.

2020
In the pandemic-shortened 2020 season, Buehler posted a 1–0 record with a 3.44 ERA in eight starts, striking out 42 batters in 36.2 innings. Buehler started the first games of the first and second round playoff series against the Milwaukee Brewers and San Diego Padres, pitching just four innings in each game, with three total runs allowed. In the NLCS against the Atlanta Braves, he started the first and sixth games, working a total of 11 innings with only one run allowed while striking out 13. He was the winning pitcher in game 6. In the third game of the 2020 World Series, Buehler picked up the win against the Tampa Bay Rays, striking out 10 in six innings while allowing one earned run on three hits. He was the third-youngest pitcher with 10 or more strikeouts and three or fewer hits in a World Series game, behind only Ed Walsh in 1906 and Josh Beckett in 2003. The Dodgers won the World Series in six games.

2021
Buehler was eligible for salary arbitration for the first time before the 2021 season. On February 10, he signed a two-year contract with the Dodgers for $8 million. 

On June 20, Buehler won his seventh game of the season, tying Kirby Higbe for the Dodgers franchise record of 23 consecutive starts without a loss, going back to the 2019 season. He was a 2021 National League All Star, and the July 2021 NL Pitcher of the Month. 

Buehler was 16–4 (.800; 2nd in the NL) in the 2021 regular season, with a 2.47 ERA (3rd) and 212 strikeouts (7th). His 16 wins were 3rd in the league. He gave up 6.458 hits per 9 innings (2nd in the NL), and had a WHIP of 0.968 (4th). Buehler started the first game of the 2021 NLDS against the San Francisco Giants, allowing three runs on  innings to take the loss. He then started Game 4 on short rest, the first time he had done that in his career. In the game, he allowed one run on three hits in  innings. He struggled in his first start in the 2021 NLCS, allowing four runs on six hits while walking three in  innings in game 3. He again pitched on short rest in game 6 after Max Scherzer was unable to go, he allowed seven hits and four runs (three of them on a home run by Eddie Rosario) in four innings while striking out six as the Dodgers were eliminated from the playoffs.

2022
Buehler made his first Opening Day start on April 8 for the Dodgers against the Rockies. He allowed two runs in five innings to record the win. On April 25, he pitched his first career shutout against the Arizona Diamondbacks, striking out 10 batters and allowing only three hits and no walks. Buehler made 12 starts for the Dodgers in 2022, with a 6–3 record and 4.02 ERA. He left a game with the Giants on June 10 because of discomfort in his pitching elbow which eventually resulted in him undergoing season ending surgery. After his surgery was performed the Dodgers announced that Buehler underwent both a second Tommy John surgery as well as flexor tendon repair, likely keeping him sidelined until the 2024 season. Despite the injury, the Dodgers signed him to a $8.025 million contract for the 2023 season to avoid salary arbitration.

Personal life
Buehler has heard the famous roll call scene from the 1986 film Ferris Bueller's Day Off many times throughout his life. Buehler embraced the nickname "Ferris," incorporating it into his Twitter handle and wearing it on his jersey during the 2018 MLB Players Weekend. He chose to wear the nickname "Buetane" for the 2019 MLB Players Weekend.

Buehler is a native of Lexington, Kentucky, the "Horse Capital of the World," home to the Kentucky Horse Park, The Red Mile and Keeneland race courses, and grew up a big fan of horse racing. He has a minority ownership stake in 2020 Kentucky Derby and 2020 Breeders' Cup Classic winner Authentic, trained by Bob Baffert. Buehler attended the 2020 Breeders' Cup Classic to see Authentic win at Keeneland.

Buehler is married to McKenzie Marcinek, whom he began dating in high school, and the couple reside in Lexington.

See also

 2014 NCAA Division I baseball tournament
 2014 Vanderbilt Commodores baseball team
 List of Los Angeles Dodgers no-hitters
 List of Major League Baseball no-hitters
 List of World Series starting pitchers
 Los Angeles Dodgers award winners and league leaders

References

External links

Vanderbilt Commodores profile

1994 births
Living people
Major League Baseball pitchers
National League All-Stars
Los Angeles Dodgers players
Arizona League Dodgers players
Great Lakes Loons players
Rancho Cucamonga Quakes players
Tulsa Drillers players
Oklahoma City Dodgers players
Yarmouth–Dennis Red Sox players
Vanderbilt Commodores baseball players
Baseball players from Lexington, Kentucky